Anopina phaeopina is a species of moth of the family Tortricidae. It is found in Mexico.

References

Moths described in 2000
phaeopina
Moths of Central America